The Alexander Macomb House at 39–41 Broadway in Lower Manhattan, New York City, served as the second U.S. Presidential Mansion. President George Washington occupied it from February 23 to August 30, 1790, during New York City's two-year term as the national capital. The building was demolished in 1940.

Macomb 
Alexander Macomb (1748–1831) was an Irish-born American merchant and land speculator. He built the four-story city house on the west side of Broadway in 1786–1788. Macomb leased it to the French Minister Plenipotentiary, the Comte de Moustier, who occupied it until his return to Paris in early 1790. 
It was one of a block of three houses erected in 1787 and was four stories and an attic high, with a width of fifty-six feet. From the rear of the main rooms glass doors opened onto a balcony giving an uninterrupted view of the Hudson River. On entering, one found a large hall with a continuous flight of stairs to the top of the house. On each side of the hall were spacious, high-ceilinged rooms, used for the levees and dinners and always referred to by Washington as "public rooms."

President Washington purchased furniture, mirrors and draperies from the departing Minister with his own money, including American-made furniture in the French style. Some of these items survive at Mount Vernon and elsewhere.

Presidential Mansion 

The first Presidential Mansion was the Samuel Osgood House at 1 Cherry Street in Manhattan, which Washington occupied from April 23, 1789, to February 23, 1790. He had been living there a week prior to his April 30, 1789, inauguration as first President of the United States. The Osgood House (demolished 1856) was in the most congested part of Manhattan, near the port along the East River, and Washington found it cramped for his presidential household.

The Macomb House was significantly larger, located in a neighborhood just north of the Bowling Green.

The presidential household functioned with a staff of about 20, composed of wage workers, indentured servants and enslaved servants. Slavery was legal in New York, and Washington brought 7 enslaved Africans from Mount Vernon to work in his presidential household: William Lee, Christopher Sheels, Giles, Paris, Austin, Moll, and Oney Judge.

Two of Martha Washington's grandchildren were part of the First Family: Nelly Custis (born 1779) and "Wash" Custis (born 1781).

Under the July 1790 Residence Act, the national capital moved to Philadelphia, Pennsylvania, for a 10-year period while the permanent national capital was under construction in the District of Columbia. Washington vacated the Macomb House on August 30, 1790, and returned to Mount Vernon, stopping in Philadelphia to examine what was to become the third Presidential Mansion, the Masters–Penn–Morris House at 190 High Street.

Hotel 

In 1821, the Macomb House was converted into Bunker's Mansion House Hotel: "Bunker's Mansion House, a famous hotel, was situated at No. 39 Broadway, and was a large double-brick house, erected in 1786 by General Alexander Macomb as a residence for himself. It was a most comfortable and well-conducted hotel, and was patronized largely by Southern families. Bunker, who was noted for his affability to his customers, grew rich rapidly, and eventually sold the property and retired from business."

In 1861, Daniel Huntington painted a fanciful depiction of the interior. "Mr. Huntington has in his famous painting of the Republican Court made the Macomb home on Broadway the background of his picture. This was a much more commodious house, to which the President and his family removed in the spring of 1790."

In 1939, the Daughters of the Revolution erected a bronze plaque at 39 Broadway. The house was demolished in 1940.

See also
 Samuel Osgood House, first Presidential mansion
 President's House (Philadelphia), third Presidential mansion
 Germantown White House, twice temporarily occupied by President Washington
 White House
 List of residences of presidents of the United States

References

 At NYC auction in 1787, McComb purchased 19,840 acres in Range 2, Township 6 of the Northwest Territory; see Papers of the Continental Congress, No. 59, Vol. 3, pp. 135–140.
 Decatur, Stephen Jr., The Private Affairs of George Washington (1933).
 Miller, Agnes. "The Macomb House: Presidential Mansion". Michigan History, vol. 37 (December 1953): 373–384.

External links
 
 Macomb's Mansion (mlloyd.org).
 Herbert, Lelia, The First American: His Homes and His Households (New York: Harper & Brothers, 1900).

Broadway (Manhattan)
Buildings and structures demolished in 1940
Demolished buildings and structures in Manhattan
Financial District, Manhattan
Houses completed in 1788
New York City as the National Capital
Presidency of George Washington
Presidential homes in the United States
Macomb
Slavery in the United States
Macomb
Homes of United States Founding Fathers